Licun is a transfer station of the Qingdao Metro on Line 2 and Line 3. It opened on 16 December 2015.

Gallery

References

Qingdao Metro stations
Railway stations in China opened in 2015